Phytoecia malachitica is a species of beetle in the family Cerambycidae. It was described by Hippolyte Lucas in 1849. It is known from Portugal, Sicily, Algeria, Spain, Morocco, and Tunisia. It feeds on Cerinthe major, Cerinthe gymnandra, Echium italicum, Cynoglossum cheirifolium, Cynoglossum creticum, and Cynoglossum clandestinum.

References

Phytoecia
Beetles described in 1849